The Wehrgeschichtliches Museum Rastatt (in English: Military History Museum) or WGM is a military historical museum in Rastatt, Germany. Since 1956, it has been housed in the south wing of the Schloss Rastatt. The museum was originally found in 1934 as the Badisches Armeemuseum. In 1969, the museum changed its name to Wehrgeschichtliches Museum.

Gallery

External links

References 

Military and war museums in Germany
Museums in Baden-Württemberg